was a town located in Minamikoma District, Yamanashi Prefecture, Japan.

As of 2003, the town had an estimated population of 4,402 and a density of 94.04 persons per km². The total area was 46.81 km².

On March 8, 2010, Kajikazawa, along with the town of Masuho (also from Minamikoma District), was merged to create the town of Fujikawa.

External links
 Fujikawa official website 

Dissolved municipalities of Yamanashi Prefecture
Fujikawa, Yamanashi